Ethmia cyrenaicella is a moth in the family Depressariidae. It was described by Hans Georg Amsel in 1955. It is found in Libya.

References

Moths described in 1955
cyrenaicella